Out of the Blue is an album led by American trumpeter Blue Mitchell recorded and released in 1959 on the Riverside label.

Reception

The AllMusic review by Scott Yanow awarded the album 4 stars and stated "This early recording by Blue Mitchell finds the distinctive trumpeter in excellent form... It's an enjoyable date of high-quality hard bop."

Track listing
All compositions by Blue Mitchell except as indicated
 "Blues on My Mind" (Benny Golson) – 9:05 
 "It Could Happen to You" (Johnny Burke, Jimmy Van Heusen) – 5:52 
 "Boomerang" (Clark Terry) – 5:01 
 "Sweet-Cakes" – 6:09 
 "Missing You" (Ronnell Bright) – 5:40 
 "When the Saints Go Marching In" (Traditional) – 7:00 
 "Studio B" (Paul Chambers) – 7:18 Bonus track on CD reissue 
Recorded at Reeves Sound Studios in New York City on January 5, 1959.

Personnel
Blue Mitchell – trumpet  
Benny Golson – tenor saxophone 
Wynton Kelly (tracks 1–6), Cedar Walton (track 7) – piano
Paul Chambers (tracks 2 & 5–7), Sam Jones (tracks 1, 3 & 4) – bass
Art Blakey – drums

References

Riverside Records albums
Blue Mitchell albums
1959 albums
Albums produced by Orrin Keepnews